Dramalj is a village in Croatia. It is part of the town of Crikvenica, extending from the neighborhood Crni mol to the tourist complex Kačjak. Dramalj has 1,485 inhabitants, most of whom are empolyed in the tourism and catering industries. More intensive development of the village started back in the 19th century following the tourism boom in the nearby Crikvenica area, as well as the rest of the Croatian Littoral.

The village has several restaurants offering local specialties, as well as a post office and a clinic providing medical assistance to tourists. It is also home to the Dramalj Culture Hall, where traditional carnival feasts are held during the winter.

History

Dramalj was first mentioned in the 18th century, when it was named Zagorje - Dramalj. In the beginning, it was a fishing port with olive groves, most of which were owned by the inhabitants of Tribalj valley. 

There are ruins of an ancient Liburnian hill fort enclosed with a dry-stone dyke above Dramalj. Amphorae found around the Kačjak peninsula are evidence of an ancient Roman port located there at the time. Another one of Dramalj's landmarks is a "toš", an old olive press.

In the Austro-Hungarian times, Dramalj was part of Sveta Jelena County (St. Helen), which was founded in 1809. The parish house and the Church of St. Helen were built after 1812. The church was built on the foundations of an old chapel. G. Capovilla, a stone carver from Rijeka, made the altar in 1796. The construction of the church was financed by the parish and initiated by Mate Balas, then parish priest. The interior of the church was refurbished in the 19th century, the pulpit in 1837 and the main altar in 1845. The name of the village was soon after changed to Sveta Jelena. After the World War II, the former name Dramalj was restored.

The Culture Hall is located in the vicinity of the church. In 1939, the building was home to the first public library in Dramalj.

Climate
The North Adriatic, especially in this part of the Quarner Riviera experiences a mild Mediterranean climate with some continental influence. The summers are sunny, dry and hot, while the winters are rainy and relatively mild with characteristic winds. The average annual air temperature is 14.2 °C. The coldest month is January, while the hottest one is July.

Average cloud cover in Dramalj is 0.51 (5.1 tenths of obscured sky), varying from 0.33 to 0.62. Average annual relative humidity is 70%, while the peak rainy period is in October and November. Air pressure averages .

Bora and jugo are the predominant winds in the area, while Ostro, maestral and levant) are also present. Bora typically blows from November to February, peaking in strength in January, while jugo is most frequently experienced from May to August with the average maximum in July. Ostro, a southern wind, reaches its maximum in November. A particular climatic feature is the so-called "kalma", characterized by calm weather without any wind.

The soil in Dramalj area is mostly composed of porous karst (limestone). The sea is shallow, even at a considerable distance from the coast. Wave strength is generally minor, allergens in air scant, while the salt and ozone content in the air is increased with minimal aerobic pollution.

The area features climatic and bioclimatic conditions favorable for thalassotherapy and health tourism.

Notable Attractions

Notable attractions in Dramalj include: 
 A motorized train for children
 Restaurants that offer Croatian cuisine and seafood
 The Kačjak tourist complex, composed of bungalows and pavilions.
 The Dramalj Culture Hall

See also
 Vrtare Male

References

External links

 Tourist association of Dramalj 

Populated places in Primorje-Gorski Kotar County